Thomas Hayden may refer to:

Thomas Hayden (Irish politician) (fl. 1940s), Irish senator
Thomas Hayden (weightlifter) (1926–2018), Irish weightlifter
Thomas C. Hayden, American football coach
Tom Hayden (1939–2016), American social and political activist, author and politician
Tommy Hayden (born 1978), American motorcycle racer

See also
Thomas Haydon (disambiguation)
Tom Hagen